The Former Melbourne Magistrates' Court was the original home of Melbourne's City Court and District Court, as well as their emergency court. The French Romanesque building is located on the corner of La Trobe and Russell streets in the Melbourne city centre.

History
It was opened on 20 January 1914, and served the City for 81 years, before a new Magistrates' Court building was opened on William Street in 1995.

Notable trials conducted at the court include that of  Squizzy Taylor

Courthouses have occupied the site since 1843.

RMIT
The Former Melbourne Magistrates' Court became part of the neighbouring City campus of the Royal Melbourne Institute of Technology in 1997, and is officially known as RMIT Building 20 (Former Melbourne Magistrates' Court). RMIT also acquired the Former City Watch-house, located next to the Court, and together they form Building 20. The Court building is currently used for lectures and moot courts, and houses offices for RMIT's administration and Chancellery. The Watch-house building is currently used as a museum.

Architecture
A notable feature of the District Court is the historic wooden canopy located over the seat upon which the Magistrate sits in the main courtroom. The canopy was taken from old Supreme Court which had originally been located at the site. At the corner of Latrobe Street and Russell Street, in the former main entrance, there are numerous holes in the bricks that were caused by shrapnel from the Russell Street Bombing that can still be seen today.

Gallery

See also
Melbourne Magistrates' Court
Magistrates' Court of Victoria
RMIT City campus, of which the court building is now a part

References

Courthouses in Melbourne
RMIT University buildings
Heritage-listed buildings in Melbourne
Buildings and structures in Melbourne City Centre
1914 establishments in Australia
Gothic Revival architecture in Melbourne
Buildings and structures completed in 1914